Anatoli Igorevich Nemchenko (born 22 August 2000) is a Russian football player. He plays for FC Kosmos Dolgoprudny.

Club career
He made his debut in the Russian Premier League for PFC Sochi on 9 August 2020 in a game against FC Spartak Moscow, he substituted Nikita Burmistrov in the 65th minute.

On 22 January 2021, he joined FC Olimp-Dolgoprudny on loan until the end of the 2020–21 season with an extension option.

References

External links
 
 
 

2000 births
Sportspeople from Stavropol Krai
People from Kislovodsk
Living people
Russian footballers
Association football midfielders
FC Urozhay Krasnodar players
PFC Sochi players
Russian Premier League players
Russian Second League players
FC Olimp-Dolgoprudny players